Bayou Huffpower is a stream in Avoyelles Parish between Cottonport and Bunkie, Louisiana, named for an old settler. Bayou Hoffpauir was the name of a United States post office in the area. Pitt's Mill was located on Bayou Huffpower at Evergreen-Holmesville Road and Layou du Lac Road, two miles west of Evergreen, Louisiana.

See also
 Epps plantation
 Solomon Northup, author of the memoir, Twelve Years a Slave
 Patsey
 Frithland, a house on the National Register of Historic Places
 James Madison Wells, who had a sugar plantation on the bayou called New Hope, near Alexandria

References

Geography of Avoyelles Parish, Louisiana
Wetlands and bayous of Louisiana